Gunman Clive 2 is a platform game developed and published by independent Swedish studio Hörberg Productions. It is the sequel to 2012's Gunman Clive.

Gameplay
Gunman Clive 2 is an platform game. The game features a total of 25 stages and uses the same engine as Gunman Clive, but features oversaturated colors compared to the predecessor. The gameplay is largely similar to that of its predecessor and features three playable characters: Gunman Clive, Ms. Johnson, and Chieftain Bob. After finishing the game, a secret character, a duck, is unlocked.

Development
Gunman Clive 2 was developed and published by Hörberg Productions. The game was released for Nintendo 3DS handheld console on 29 January 2015. It was released for Windows on 3 September 2015.

In June 2015, Bertil Hörberg announced the game and its predecessor would be released on the Wii U as Gunman Clive HD Collection. The collection was released on September 3, 2015 in North America and Europe, and October 28, 2015 in Japan. The collection was also released on the Nintendo Switch on January 17, 2019, and PlayStation 4 on May 22, 2020.

Reception

Gunman Clive 2 holds a rating of 80/100 on review aggregate site Metacritic, indicating "generally favourable reviews".

Sales 
There are no specific sales figures for Gunman Clive 2. However, the game's developer, Bertil Hörberg, commented on the sales on Twitter and said that they were "[...] a bit disappointing [...]" compared to its predecessor. The Gunman Clive HD Collection was sold 9,000 times until January 2016.

External links 
Official website
Official profile at nintendo.com
List of soundtracks in Gunman Clive 2

References

2015 video games
Hörberg Productions games
Nintendo 3DS games
Nintendo Switch games
Platform games
PlayStation 4 games
Single-player video games
Video games developed in Sweden
Windows games